Scleral tattooing is the practice of tattooing the sclera, or white part, of the human eye. Rather than being injected into the tissue, the dye is injected between two layers of the eye, then gradually spreads. The process remains uncommon due to professionals' discomfort performing the procedure and is illegal in the American states Oklahoma and Indiana and the Canadian provinces Ontario and Sasketchewan.

History and practice
Writer and artist Shannon Larratt photoshopped his eyes in a photo to look like the blue eyes of the Fremen in Frank Herbert's novel Dune. Inspired by his then-wife's eye implant surgery, he reached out to Howie "Luna Cobra" Rollins to devise a method to color his eyes permanently blue. Cobra agreed to attempt the procedure if Larratt could find two other volunteers. Larratt recruited Joshua Matthew Rahn and Paul "Pauly Unstoppable" Mowery (now known as Farrah Flawless). As of March 2013, both Rahn and Larratt have died from conditions unrelated to the procedure (murder and tubular aggregate myopathy, respectively), making Farrah Flawless the person who has had scleral tattoos for the longest period of time in the world.

Procedure
Cobra initially attempted a procedure that involved covering the needle with ink the puncturing the eye but deemed it unsuccessful. The technique he used during the procedure, injecting the sclera with blue dye, is similar to an established method practiced by surgeons who install eye implants. Larratt's wife Rachel underwent a procedure where the surgeon injected small drops of saline to create a fluid-filled pocket between the conjunctiva and the sclera, where he inserted a thin piece of platinum jewelry. The saline eventually dissipated and left only the jewelry behind. Larratt called Cobra's procedure "effectively painless because there aren't nerve endings in the surface of the eye" and claimed that the after-effects included minor pain, bruising, discomfort, and mild blistering between the sclera and conjunctiva. 

In a 2007 Body Modification Ezine article, Larratt discussed the risks and possible complications of the procedure, including blindness, and said it should never be performed without a professional. He also stressed that scleral tattooing is still a new body modification and potential long-term effects have not yet been measured.

Legislation

In 2009, the Oklahoma Senate passed Bill 844, filed by Senator Cliff Branan, to make scleral tattooing illegal. This bill was supported by the Oklahoma Academy of Ophthalmology. In 2018, Indiana became the second state to outlaw this procedure; a $10,000 fine was set for violators. In Canada, Ontario (February 2017) and Saskatchewan (January 2020) have banned both scleral tattooing and the implantation of eye jewelry under the conjunctiva.

See also
Corneal tattooing

References

Tattooing by body part